is a Japanese football player. He plays for FC Imabari.

 is a guitarist and Associate professor of Osaka University Of Arts.

Club statistics

References

External links

j-league

1988 births
Living people
Kochi University alumni
Association football people from Ehime Prefecture
Japanese footballers
J1 League players
J2 League players
Japan Football League players
Montedio Yamagata players
SP Kyoto FC players
FC Imabari players
Association football defenders